Chennai Super Kings (CSK) are a franchise cricket team based in Chennai, Tamil Nadu, India, which plays in the Indian Premier League (IPL). They were one of the eight teams that competed in the 2019 Indian Premier League and where the defending champions. having won the 2018 Indian Premier League

Background

Player retention, transfers and auction

In November 2018, the Super Kings announced their list of retained players for the 2019 season. The list included Mahendra Singh Dhoni, Suresh Raina, Faf du Plessis, Murali Vijay, Ravindra Jadeja, Sam Billings, Mitchell Santner, David Willey, Dwayne Bravo, Shane Watson, Lungi Ngidi, Imran Tahir, Kedar Jadhav, Ambati Rayudu, Harbhajan Singh, Deepak Chahar, KM Asif, Karn Sharma, Dhruv Shorey, Narayan Jagadeesan, Shardul Thakur, Monu Kumar and Chaitanya Bishnoi.

On 18 December 2018, the IPL player auction was held in which the Super Kings signed two additional players, Mohit Sharma & Ruturaj Gaikwad.

Preseason
On 20 March 2019, the franchise announced that they would donate the proceeds from the tickets sales of their opening match of the season to the families of the CRPF personnel killed in the Pulwama attack.

A five part docu-drama on the Super Kings called Roar of the Lion was released on Hotstar on 20 March 2019.

Team analysis
The Indian Express wrote in its team preview that the Super Kings were among the favorites to win this season.  Two of three editors at the National predicted the Super Kings to retain the title in 2019. According to Firstpost, the Super Kings will "bank on its batting strength to win games, like the previous year." News18 listed the experienced players and spinners suited for the Super Kings as the team strengths, while saying "the pace department is something which will make CSK slightly vulnerable." Sportstar pointed out that the average age of the squad at the end of the auction was 33.5 and remarked that the team will "once again bank on the experience of its Indian and international stars to make an instant impact."

Squad 
 Players with international caps are listed in bold.

Coaching and support staff 
 Head coach –  Stephen Fleming
 Batting coach –  Michael Hussey
 Bowling coach –  Lakshmipathy Balaji
 Bowling consultant –  Eric Simons
 Physical trainer –  Greg King
 Physio –  Tommy Simsek
 Team manager –  Russell Radhakrishnan
 Team doctor –  Madhu
Source: Chennai  Super Kings Couching and Supporting Staff List.

League table

Results

League stage

Playoffs 

Qualifier 1

Qualifier 2

Final

Statistics

Most runs

 Source:Cricinfo

Most wickets

Imran Tahir won the Purple Cap as the bowler who took the most wickets in the competition
 Source:Cricinfo

Awards and achievements

Awards
 Man of the Match

References

2019 Indian Premier League
Chennai Super Kings seasons